The Serraninae is a subfamily of perciform ray-finned fishes in the family Serranidae. It is made up of ten genera and 87 species.

Characters
The fishes in the subfamily Serraninae, the serranines, are small species within the family Serranidae. They generally have ten spines in their dorsal fins and seven soft rays in their anal fins. They are also characterised by the fin spines being unserrated. The genera within the Serraninae are separated by the counts of the soft rays in the dorsal fin.

Genera
The following genera are classified within the Serraninae:

 Bullisichthys Rivas, 1971
 Centropristis Cuvier, 1829
 Chelidoperca Boulenger, 1895
 Cratinus Steindachner, 1878
 Diplectrum Holbrook, 1855
 Dules Cuvier, 1829
 Hypoplectrus Gill, 1861
 Paralabrax Girard, 1856
 Parasphyraenops T.H. Bean, 1912
 Schultzea Woods, 1958
 Serraniculus Ginsburg, 1952
 Serranus Cuvier, 1816

Taxonomy
The Anthiinae are sometimes placed within the Serraninae but these fishes are mainly deepwater species and have a soft ray count in the anal fin with a mode of eight. The subfamily is the most basal of the three subfamilies within the Serranidae, with the genus Centropristis being the most basal in the Serraninae.

References

Serranidae
Ray-finned fish subfamilies
Taxa named by William John Swainson